Captain Ian Donald Roy McDonald  (9 September 1898 – 22 September 1920) was a British World War I flying ace credited with 20 aerial victories. Although born in the  British West Indies, he returned to England to serve in the air force. After his successful career in combat, he spent a short time at home before returning to the colours. He served in Iraq postwar, and was executed there by insurgents.

Early life
Although McDonald was born in the Caribbean, he was a British citizen. His father was a legislator.

World War I service
The younger McDonald joined the Royal Flying Corps in 1916 and became a fighter pilot. On 26 April 1917, he was appointed a flying officer with the rank of temporary second lieutenant. He was first assigned to 39 (Home Defence) Squadron. From there, he transferred to A Flight, 24 Squadron on 11 July 1917.  Flying an Airco DH.5, he scored his first three victories between 30 November and 10 December 1917. Then the squadron upgraded to Royal Aircraft Factory SE.5as. McDonald began to score with his new machine; his second victory on 26 February 1918, shared with Ronald T. Mark, Herbert Richardson, and three other pilots, made McDonald an ace.

McDonald missed scoring in March, but was appointed as a flight commander with the rank of temporary captain on the 15th. He tallied six wins in April, four in May, and three in the first week in June. Then, on 17 June, teaming with Horace Barton, George Owen Johnson, and C. E. Walton, he forced down into captivity one of Germany's leading aces, Kurt Wüsthoff. Four days later, McDonald went for a rest. He had become the squadron's second scoring ace.

List of aerial victories

Post World War I
He exited the Royal Air Force in early 1919 and went home to Antigua, due to suffering from eye strain. He then returned to the RAF, gaining a permanent commission as a lieutenant on 1 August 1919 and becoming an instructor at RAF Cranwell. In 1920, he was assigned to flight operations in Iraq. On 22 September 1920, he flew DH.9a no. F2838 on a relief expedition to drop food to a stranded boat, the Greenfly. He was shot down by ground fire at Samawahon, and seen to wade ashore. He was executed at Dangatora. He is commemorated on Panels 43 and 64 of the Basra Memorial.

Honours and awards
Distinguished Flying Cross
Lt. (temp. Capt.) Ian Donald Roy McDonald, M.C.
"A dashing, fighting pilot. In the past two months he has destroyed five enemy machines and brought down two others out of control. At all times he shows a fine offensive spirit and complete disregard of danger."

Military Cross
Lt. Ian Donald Roy McDonald, R.A.F.
"For conspicuous gallantry and devotion to duty. With seven scouts he attacked eighteen enemy machines, of which three were destroyed and one driven down completely out of control. When driven down to within 200 feet of the ground by two enemy machines owing to a choked engine, he turned on them and drove one down. He has in all destroyed eleven enemy aircraft and carried out valuable work in attacking enemy troops on the ground."

References

Bibliography 
 
 

1898 births
1920 deaths
People from St. John's, Antigua and Barbuda
Royal Flying Corps officers
Royal Air Force personnel of World War I
British World War I flying aces
Recipients of the Military Cross
Recipients of the Distinguished Flying Cross (United Kingdom)